Montreal Concordia FC was a Canadian soccer team based in Montreal, Quebec, formerly known as Sparta FC and then Canadian Alouettes FC. The club won Canadian titles in 1959 and 1961.

In the 1950s, the club was known as Canadian Czechoslovak Sparta FC Montreal, or simply Sparta FC. In 1956, the team won the Quebec Cup and also represented the province in the Challenge Trophy playdowns for the first time. The team was coached that year by Doug McMahon.

In 1959, with real estate businessman Joe Slyomovics serving as president, the team changed its name to Canadian Alouettes FC. In September, the team won their Canadian title, defeating the Westminster Royals FC to lift the Carling’s Red Cap Trophy.

In 1960, Slyomivics changed the team name to Montreal Concordia FC. In the National Soccer League, Concordia finished in third place in the league standings.

In 1961, Concordia FC played in both the National Soccer League and the International Soccer League. They finished second in the National Soccer League standings. On 29 July, Concordia defeated Vancouver Firefighters 1-0 in Montreal's Faillon Stadium to capture their second Canadian championship in three years.

Coaches 
Doug McMahon
Alex Skocen
Norberto Yacono
Skender "Alex" Perolli (1961)

Matches in the 1961 International Soccer League

References 

2017 Canada Soccer Records & Results

Soccer clubs in Montreal
Canadian National Soccer League teams